Trenton Joseph "T.J." Brown (born May 22, 1990) is an American mixed martial artist currently competing as a Featherweight in the Ultimate Fighting Championship.

Mixed martial arts career

Early career
Brown made his MMA debut in 2013 at Cage Combat Championships 5, where he lost the bout after he didn't answer the bell at the start of round 2. Brown then compiled a 13–6 record across various regional MMA promotions, most notably losing to Bobby Moffett via split decision at RFA 44: Moisés vs. Freeman and Cody Carrillo via KO in the first round at C3 Fights: Border Wars.

Dana White's Tuesday Night Contender Series 

After getting knocked down in the first and having a point deducted in the second round, Brown won the bout via arm-triangle choke in the third round, winning an UFC contract in the process.

Ultimate Fighting Championship
Brown made his promotional debut against Jordan Griffin at UFC Fight Night: Benavidez vs. Figueiredo on February 29, 2020. He lost the fight via second-round submission.

Brown faced Danny Chavez at UFC 252 on August 15, 2020. At the weigh-ins, Brown weighed 0.5 pound over the non-title fight featherweight limit and forfeited 20 percent of his purse to Chavez. He lost the bout via unanimous decision.

After being knocked down in the second round, he won the bout via a controversial split decision. 15 out of 15 media members scored the bout for Kamaka.

Brown was scheduled to face Gabriel Benitez on January 15, 2022 at UFC on ESPN 32. Three days before the event, Benitez was forced to pull out and Charles Rosa replaced him with the bout now taking place at Lightweight. Brown won the fight via unanimous decision.

As the first fight of his new four-fight contract, Brown faced Shayilan Nuerdanbieke on June 25, 2022 at UFC on ESPN 38. He lost the fight via unanimous decision.

Brown faced Erik Silva on December 10, 2022 at UFC 282. He won the fight via submission in round three. This win earned him the Performance of the Night award.

Brown is scheduled to face Bill Algeo on April 15, 2023 at UFC on ESPN 44.

Championships and accomplishments

Mixed martial arts
 Ultimate Fighting Championship
 Performance of the Night (One time)

Personal life 
Brown is a single father to a son, Kyler.

Mixed martial arts record 
 

|- 
|Win	
|align=center|17–9
|Erik Silva
|Submission (arm-triangle choke)
|UFC 282
|
|align=center|3
|align=center|3:41
|Las Vegas, Nevada, United States
|
|-
|Loss
|align=center|16–9
|Shayilan Nuerdanbieke
|Decision (unanimous)
|UFC on ESPN: Tsarukyan vs. Gamrot
|
|align=center|3
|align=center|5:00
|Las Vegas, Nevada, United States
|-
|Win
|align=center|16–8
|Charles Rosa
|Decision (unanimous)
|UFC on ESPN: Kattar vs. Chikadze
|
|align=center|3
|align=center|5:00
|Las Vegas, Nevada, United States
|
|-
|Win
|align=center|15–8
|Kai Kamaka III
|Decision (split)
|UFC on ESPN: Reyes vs. Procházka
|
|align=center|3
|align=center|5:00
|Las Vegas, Nevada, United States
|
|-
|Loss
|align=center|14–8
| Danny Chavez
| Decision (unanimous)
| UFC 252
| 
| align=center| 3
| align=center| 5:00
| Las Vegas, Nevada, United States
| 
|-
|Loss
|align=center|14–7
|Jordan Griffin
|Technical Submission (guillotine choke)
|UFC Fight Night: Benavidez vs. Figueiredo
|
|align=center|2
|align=center|3:38
|Norfolk, Virginia, United States
|
|-
| Win
| align=center| 14–6
| Dylan Lockard
|Submission (arm-triangle choke)
|Dana White's Contender Series 26
|
|align=center|3
|align=center|2:59
|Las Vegas, Nevada, United States
|
|-
| Win
| align=center|13–6
|Ken Beverly
|KO (head kick)
|LFA 67 
| 
| align=center| 1
| align=center| 1:45
| Branson, Missouri, United States
|
|-
| Win
| align=center|12–6
|CJay Hunter
|Submission (arm-triangle choke)
|Pyramid Fights 11
|
| align=center| 1
| align=center| 4:50
|Little Rock, Arkansas, United States
|
|-
| Win
| align=center|11–6
| Edwin Williams
|KO (head kick)
|GCF 8
|
| align=center| 1
| align=center| 0:40
|Oklahoma City, Oklahoma, United States
|
|-
| Loss
| align=center| 10–6
|Cody Carrillo
| KO
| C3 Fights: Border Wars
| 
| align=center| 1
| align=center| 2:28
| Newkirk, Oklahoma, United States
|
|-
| Win
| align=center|10–5
| Peter Barrett
|Submission (arm-triangle choke)
| Cage Titans 36
|
| align=center|3
| align=center|0:35
|Plymouth, Massachusetts, United States
|
|-
| Loss
| align=center| 9–5
| Trey Ogden
| Submission (rear-naked choke)
|LFA 21
|
|align=center|1
|align=center|2:27
|Branson, Missouri, United States
|
|-
| Win
| align=center| 9–4
| Kevin Henry
| KO (punches)
|360 Fight Club 2
|
|align=center|1
|align=center|0:08
|Little Rock, Arkansas, United States
|
|-
| Win
| align=center| 8–4
| Tyler Smith
| Submission (rear-naked choke)
| 360 Fight Club 1
| 
| align=center|1
| align=center| 2:54
| Little Rock, Arkansas, United States
|
|-
| Loss
| align=center| 7–4
| Bobby Moffett
|Decision (split)
|RFA 46
|
|align=center|3
|align=center|5:00
|Branson, Missouri, United States
|
|-
| Loss
| align=center|7–3
|Joey Miolla
|Submission (rear-naked choke)
|RFA 44
|
| align=center| 2
| align=center| 4:32
|St. Charles, Missouri, United States
|
|-
| Win
| align=center| 7–2
| Rodney Allison
|Submission (rear-naked choke)
| XFI 17
| 
| align=center| 1
| align=center| 4:50
| Fort Smith, Arkansas, United States
| 
|-
| Win
| align=center| 6–2
| Tyrone Paige
|Decision (unanimous)
|Off The Chain MMA 11
|
|align=center|3
|align=center|5:00
|Bryant, Arkansas, United States
|
|-
| Win
| align=center|5–2
|Francisco Olivera
|Submission (arm-triangle choke)
|RMMA 35
| 
| align=center| 3
| align=center| 3:29
| New Orleans, Louisiana, United States
|
|-
| Win
| align=center|4–2
|Tyrone Paige
|Submission (arm-triangle choke)
|Off The Chain MMA 9
|
| align=center| 1
| align=center| 2:28
|Hot Springs, Arkansas, United States
|
|-
| Loss
| align=center| 3–2
| Bobby Taylor
|TKO (punches)
|RFA vs. Legacy FC 1
|
| align=center| 1
| align=center| 1:56
|Robinsonville, Mississippi, United States
|
|-
| Win
| align=center|3–1
|Deartie Tucker III
| TKO
| Off The Chain MMA 7
| 
| align=center| 1
| align=center| 0:28
|Little Rock, Arkansas, United States
|
|-
| Win
| align=center|2–1
| Latral Perdue
|Submission (rear-naked choke)
| V3 Fights: Johnson vs. Kennedy
|
| align=center|1
| align=center|0:33
|Memphis, Tennessee, United States
|
|-
| Win
| align=center| 1–1
| Adrian Walker
| Submission (arm-triangle choke)
|Off The Chain MMA 6
|
| align=center|2
| align=center|2:29
|Little Rock, Arkansas, United States
|
|-
| Loss
| align=center|0–1
| Shelby Graham
| TKO (didn't answer the bell for round 2)
|Cage Combat Championships 5
|
|align=center|1
|align=center|5:00
|Paragould, Arkansas, United States
|

Professional boxing record

References

External links 

1990 births
Living people
American male mixed martial artists
Sportspeople from Pine Bluff, Arkansas
Mixed martial artists from Arkansas
Featherweight mixed martial artists
Mixed martial artists utilizing boxing
Mixed martial artists utilizing Brazilian jiu-jitsu
Ultimate Fighting Championship male fighters
American male boxers
American practitioners of Brazilian jiu-jitsu
People awarded a black belt in Brazilian jiu-jitsu